"It All Depends on You" is a 1926 popular song with music by Ray Henderson, lyrics by Buddy G. DeSylva and Lew Brown. The song, written for the musical Big Boy, was published in 1926. It was featured in the hit 1928 Warner Bros. film The Singing Fool, starring Al Jolson, Betty Bronson and Josephine Dunn, and directed by Lloyd Bacon.

Recorded versions
  
Shirley Bassey
Ben Bernie and his Orchestra (vocal: Lambert & Hillpot) (1927)
Arthur Briggs' Savoy Syncopators (vocal: Al Bowlly) (1927)
The Broadway Bellhops (1927)
Hadda Brooks
Nat King Cole (1957)
Eddie Condon and his Band (1952)
Doris Day (1955) in the film Love Me or Leave Me and Day's Love Me or Leave Me album.
Craig Douglas
Ruth Etting (1927)
Connie Francis (1961)
Four Freshmen - The Four Freshmen and Five Guitars  (1959)
Judy Garland and Barbra Streisand (As part of their "Hooray For Love" medley in 1963)
Judy Garland and Liza Minnelli (1964)
Jackie Gleason Orchestra (1957)
Dolores Hope
Jack Hylton and his orchestra (1927)
Phyllis Dare and the Gaiety Theatre Orchestra (1927)
Harry James
Al Jolson (Stage production, 1925)
Al Jolson (1928) The Singing Fool motion picture
Dick Jurgens and his Orchestra (vocal: Ray Mcintosh) (1950)
Peggy King
Jerry Lewis - a single release in 1957.
Dorothy Loudon
Gordon MacRae
Joni Mitchell (2000)
Jaye P. Morgan
Patti Page (1959)
Johnnie Ray (1958)
Barbara Rosene
Pee Wee Russell
Dinah Shore (1949)
Frank Sinatra (with Billy May) (1958)
Frank Sinatra (with Nelson Riddle) (1960)
Frank Sinatra (with Hugo Winterhalter) (1949)
Whispering Jack Smith (1927)
Sonny Stitt
Barbra Streisand
Steve Tyrell
Jerry Vale
Helen Ward
Paul Whiteman and his Orchestra (Instrumental) (1927)
Faron Young
Lester Young

References

1926 songs
Al Bowlly songs
Doris Day songs
Frank Sinatra songs
Pop standards
Songs from musicals
Songs with lyrics by Buddy DeSylva
Songs with lyrics by Lew Brown
Songs with music by Ray Henderson